Booster Juice Inc. is a Canadian chain of juice and smoothie bars founded in 1999. The chain specializes in smoothies made of pure juice, fruit sorbet or vanilla frozen yogurt, frozen fruit, fresh yogurt and ice. Founded in Sherwood Park, Alberta by owner and CEO Dale Wishewan, the chain quickly expanded through franchising to 375 locations in Canada, one in India, one in the United Arab Emirates, two in the United States and three in Mexico. It set a Canadian record for opening 50 stores in the first two years of operation.

History
Dale Wishewan opened the first Booster Juice in 1999, when he realized the market for juice bars in Canada. Prior to opening the first Booster Juice, Wishewan tested the idea at his home by offering smoothies to family and neighbours. Shortly afterwards, the first Booster Juice location opened in November 1999 in Sherwood Park, a community located east of Edmonton. Dale Wishewan has remained the President and CEO of Booster Juice.

Booster Juice expanded to other regions Canada, although the bulk of its stores continue to be located in Western Canada. Encouraged by this success, franchises expanded internationally in the 2000s.

Controversies 
In January 2019, Alberta Health Services released a report that found chemicals, cleansers and other agents being used improperly at a Calgary Booster Juice. They found that fruits and vegetables were being washed in Sani Stuff disinfectant – a product designed for institutional cleaning. In a personal statement, CEO Dale Wishewan emphasized that this was a single case incident and they are looking into a retraining programming on the cleaning procedure.

References

External links

Official site

Drink companies of Canada
Companies based in Edmonton
Restaurants established in 1999
Fast-food chains of Canada
Privately held companies of Canada
1999 establishments in Alberta
Yogurt companies
Juice bars
Food and drink companies based in Alberta